The cerebrospinal fibers, derived from the cells of the motor area of the cerebral cortex, occupy the middle three-fifths of the base; they are continued partly to the nuclei of the motor cranial nerves, but mainly into the pyramids of the medulla oblongata.

References 

Central nervous system